Oxford United Women's Football Club is an English women's football club affiliated with Oxford United, and founded in 2005. They had major success in their first season by winning the league. In 2012/13 they won the South-West Combination and were elected as inaugural members of the Women's Super League 2nd division (WSL 2).

The success of Oxford United Women's F.C. is recognised and promoted by Oxford United.

History 

The first team won the three major cup competitions in their league.

The first Oxford United Ladies team were promoted to the Southern Region Division One, for season 2006/2007, where they continued their success and again won the League.

Oxford United Ladies have won the Ladies Oxfordshire Senior Cup, beating Henley Town Ladies 2–1 at Bicester Town F.C. The scorers were Lauren Allison and Stacey Coles five minutes from time. "Credit must go to the girls for the win," said ladies boss Ben Thomas after the match.

Current squad

Former players

Coaching Staff

Honours

 South-West Combination: Winners
 2012/2013

 Thames Valley Division Two: Winners
 2009/2010

 Oxfordshire FA County Cup : Runners up
 2009/2010

 Southern Region Division One :Runners up
2008/2009

 Southern Region Division One: 1
2006/2007
 Thames Valley Division One: 1
2005/2006
 Thames Valley League Cup: 1
2005/2006
 Oxfordshire FA County Cup: 1
2005/2006

References

External links 
 

Women's football clubs in England
Association football clubs established in 2005
Oxford United F.C.
Football clubs in Oxfordshire
Sport in Oxford
2005 establishments in England
Women's Championship (England) teams